People's Defense Force may refer to:

 People's Defense Force (comics), two fictional organizations appearing in comic books by Marvel Comics
 People's Defence Force (Grenada), the army of Grenada prior to the U.S.-led invasion of 1983
 People's Defense Force (Myanmar), the armed wing of the National Unity Government, a Burmese government in exile
 People's Defence Force (Singapore), a civil reserve element of the Singapore Armed Forces
 Tanzania People's Defence Force, the armed forces of Tanzania
 Uganda People's Defence Force, the armed forces of Uganda
 People's Defence Forces, the military wing of the Kurdistan Workers' Party